The year 1965 in archaeology involved some significant events.

Explorations

Excavations
 Start of five-year project of excavations and restorations at Altun Ha led by Dr. David Pendergast of the Royal Ontario Museum.
 Start of 18-year excavations at Roman Baths (Bath) led by Barry Cunliffe.
 Start of three-year excavations at Bab edh-Dhra.
 Hinton St Mary Mosaic in England.
 Excavations at Brahmagiri by Amalananda Ghosh.
 Further excavations at the Roman temple of Bziza by Harutune Kalayan.
 The final version of the 33-metre-high (108 ft) Tikal Temple 33 at the ancient Maya city of Tikal in Guatemala is completely dismantled by archaeologists.
 Excavation at Tel Arad by Yohanan Aharoni (continues until 1967).

Finds
 June - Jutholmen wreck (sunk c.1700) is discovered off Dalarö, Sweden.
 August - Mosaic floor at Sparsholt Roman Villa, Hampshire, England.
 November - Kyrenia ship is found near Kyrenia, Cyprus.
 December - Sword of Goujian is found in Jiangling County, China.
 Geologist Nikolai Samorukov finds petroglyphs in the rocks at Kaikuul Bluff overlooking the Pegtymel River in Chukotka Autonomous Okrug, Russia.
 Group of gold and silver vessels found at Tepe Fullol in northern Afghanistan.
 Fir Clump Stone Circle in Wiltshire, England, rediscovered.
 Mammoth remains found at Mezhirich, Ukraine.
 First fossilized fragment of the hominin later identified as Australopithecus anamensis found in the Kanapoi region of Lake Turkana.
 A carved stone head was discovered during excavations at Deganwy Castle in north Wales. Depicted wearing a crown, the figure may represented Llywelyn the Great who rebuilt the castle in the first third of the 13th century.

Publications
 R. G. Collingwood and R. P. Wright - The Roman Inscriptions of Britain, vol. 1.
 P. V. Glob - Mosefolket Jernalderens Mennesker bevaret i 2000 Ar (The Bog People: Iron-Age man preserved).

Events

Deaths
 July 14 - Herbert Maryon, British conservator (b. 1874).
 October 5 - Sir Ian Richmond, British archaeologist of Ancient Rome (b. 1902).

References

Archaeology
Archaeology
Archaeology by year